Mollie McConnell (September 24, 1865 – December 9, 1920) was an American silent film actress. 

McConnell was born in Chicago, Illinois, and attended Mills Seminary in Oakland, California. She studied further at "Miss Grant's college" in Chicago, but left there in favor of acting.

Before her 1913 movie debut, she was a national and international theater performer. In 1914, she signed a contract with Balboa Amusement Producing Company and played matronly roles in many of their films. She starred with William Garwood in the 1914 western A Ticket to Red Horse Gulch.

She married Will A. McConnell in the fall of 1890.

Partial filmography
A Ticket to Red Horse Gulch (1914)
The Red Circle (1915)
 Should a Wife Forgive? (1915)
Pay Dirt (1916)
 Shadows and Sunshine (1916)
Joy and the Dragon (1916)
Vengeance of the Dead (1917)
The Wildcat (1917)
The Neglected Wife (1917)
Bab the Fixer (1917)
The Climber (1917)
Set Free (1918)
 No Man's Land (1918)
 Go West, Young Man (1918)
 The Demon (1918)
Roped (1919)
Bare Fists (1919)
 One of the Finest (1919)
Fools and Their Money (1919)
The Feud (1919)
Dangerous to Men (1920)
Black Beauty (1921)
The Home Stretch (1921)
 Hearts and Masks (1921)

References

External links

19th-century American actresses
American stage actresses
American film actresses
American silent film actresses
Actresses from Chicago
1865 births
1920 deaths
20th-century American actresses